The Westlands Solar Park is large-scale solar power project in Kings County south of Fresno, California. It intends to build many photovoltaic power plants with a capacity totaling upwards of 2,000 megawatts (MW), larger than the world's largest photovoltaic power plants operating as of 2017. It will be constructed on brownfield land owned by the Westlands Water District that is unusable for agriculture due to excess salt pollution.

Initial operation of a 2 MW demonstration project began in 2016, with the power sold to Anaheim Public Utilities. Additional projects of 20 MW and 250 MW are in various stages of planning, as of 2017. The developers planned to have 700 MW online by 2021,  with full build-out by 2025. The real estate investment firm CIM Group joined the project in 2014. Construction began in 2020.

The first 125 MW phase of the Aquamarine project opened in September 2021, with the second 125 MW opening by the end of the year.

Phases

Electricity production
It produced 4,739 MWh in 2020.

See also

 List of largest power stations in the United States
 List of photovoltaic power stations
 Solar power in California

References

External links 
Official site
Google Earth KMZ file

2021 establishments in California
Buildings and structures in Kings County, California
San Joaquin Valley
Solar power stations in California